Markus Scholz (born 17 May 1988) is a German professional footballer who plays as a goalkeeper for TSV Steinbach Haiger.

References

External links
 
 

Living people
1988 births
Association football goalkeepers
German footballers
VfL Bochum II players
VfL Bochum players
Dynamo Dresden II players
Dynamo Dresden players
SV Waldhof Mannheim players
TSV Steinbach Haiger players
2. Bundesliga players
3. Liga players
Regionalliga players
People from Iserlohn
Sportspeople from Arnsberg (region)
Footballers from North Rhine-Westphalia